John Gibson McMynn (July 9, 1824June 5, 1900) was an American educator and school system administrator.  He was the 7th Wisconsin Superintendent of Public Instruction, the first president of the Wisconsin Teachers Association, and the founder of the public school system of Racine, Wisconsin.  He also served as a Union Army officer during the American Civil War.

Biography

Born in Palatine Bridge, New York, McMynn graduated from Williams College in 1848. In 1848, he moved to Kenosha, Wisconsin, where he started a school. In 1853, he moved to Racine, Wisconsin, to set up the public school system. In 1861, he moved to Winona, Minnesota, to help set up the first normal school in Minnesota now Winona State University. However, when the American Civil War started he went back to Wisconsin and joined the 10th Wisconsin Infantry Regiment. He was commissioned Major in the regiment and later was promoted to Colonel.  He resigned in June 1863 and returned to Wisconsin. He served as Superintendent of Public Instruction of Wisconsin from 1864 to 1868. McMynn helped set up the Wisconsin Teachers Association and was its first president, and he served as regent for the University of Wisconsin. He also worked for Jerome Case.  

McMynn died at his home in Madison on June 5, 1900.

Shortly after his death, McMynn School was established in Racine and named for him.  The school building later housed Walden III Middle and High School.  The school was demolished in 1975 and replaced by an apartment building named 
McMynn Tower.

References

1824 births
1900 deaths
People from Palatine Bridge, New York
Politicians from Kenosha, Wisconsin
Politicians from Racine, Wisconsin
People from Winona, Minnesota
Williams College alumni
Winona State University
Educators from Minnesota
Educators from Wisconsin
Superintendents of Public Instruction of Wisconsin
People of Wisconsin in the American Civil War
19th-century American politicians
Educators from New York (state)
19th-century American educators